This is a list of notable mobile apps for use in photography and videography; it includes apps for photo capture, annotation, editing and manipulation, video capture, editing and manipulation. Apps only for video or image sharing or viewing are excluded.

List

References

Photography and videography apps